Witch Hunt is a role-playing game published by StatCom Simulations Inc. in 1983.

Description
Witch Hunt is a historical/horror system set in Salem in 1692. The PCs are witches (with actual magical powers), or magistrates determined to hunt them down. The rules cover witches and magic, magistrates and the law, the town crier, life in 1692, etc. The game includes an introductory miniscenario based on a historical incident.

The boxed set is presented with a full color painting on the front, and includes the main booklet which is both the rules and an introductory scenario, a double A4 black-and-white map of Salem village, a sample double-sided character sheet, and two Gamescience micro D20's.

Publication history
Witch Hunt was designed by Paul D. Baader and Roger Buckelew, and published by StatCom Simulations in 1983 as a boxed set containing a 48-page rulebook, a sample character sheet, a map, and dice.

Reception
Witch Hunt was reviewed by Jon Sutherland in issue 61 of White Dwarf magazine (January 1985), rating it a 5 out of 10 overall. Sutherland concludes the review by saying: "Witch Hunt is interesting in a limited way, in fact 'limited' is a good word to sum the game up. There are precious few innovations in evidence and I couldn't imagine players wanting to bother playing it more than once or twice. It is neither 'realistic' nor comprehensive enough to merit recommendation."

Lawrence Schick comments that "This is a strange one".

Reviews
Different Worlds (Issue 35 - Jul 1984)
Fantasy Gamer (Issue 5 - Apr 1984)

References

Horror role-playing games
Role-playing games introduced in 1983